Dr. Ahmad Fakhruddin Sheikh Fakhrurazi (b. 27 April 1971) is a Malaysian politician. He was elected Perikatan Nasional MP for Kuala Kedah in the 2022 general election. He was a member of Malaysian Islamic Party (PAS), a component party of Perikatan Nasional (PN).

Election results

See also 
 Members of the Dewan Rakyat, 15th Malaysian Parliament

References 

Living people
Members of the 15th Malaysian Parliament
21st-century Malaysian politicians
Malaysian Islamic Party politicians
1951 births